Oligophlebia is a genus of moths in the family Sesiidae, the clearwing moths. They are native to the Palearctic realm.

As of 2014 there are eight species in the genus.

Species include:
Oligophlebia amalleuta  Meyrick, 1910
Oligophlebia cristata  Le Cerf, 1916b
Oligophlebia episcopopa (Meyrick, 1926)
Oligophlebia micra (Gorbunov, 1988)
Oligophlebia minor Xu & Arita, 2014
Oligophlebia nigralba  Hampson, 1893
Oligophlebia subapicalis  Hampson, 1919
Oligophlebia ulmi (Yang & Wang, 1989b)

References

Sesiidae